The expulsion of the Muslims from the Northern province was an act of ethnic cleansing carried out by the Tamil militant Liberation Tigers of Tamil Eelam (LTTE) organization in October 1990. Yogi, the LTTE's political spokesman claimed that this expulsion was carried out in retaliation for atrocities committed against Tamils in the Eastern Province by Muslims, who were seen by the LTTE as collaborators with the Sri Lankan Army. As a consequence, in October 1990, the LTTE forcibly expelled 72,000 strong Muslim population from the Northern Province.

Background
In the early years of Tamil political struggle for linguistic parity, a few Sri Lankan Muslims as a Tamil-speaking people identified with the Tamil cause and participated in it. Even during the early years of Tamil militant struggle for separatism, a few Muslim youth joined Tamil militant groups, though there has been forced recruitment of Muslim youths by Tamil militants. However, despite being a Tamil-speaking group, the Muslims see themselves as a different ethnicity or use their religious identity as their primary identity. With the creation of the Sri Lanka Muslim Congress on 21 September 1981, the idea of the Muslim people of Sri Lanka being separate from the Tamils, was being reinforced. Due to this, they felt that if the goal of Tamil Eelam was reached, they would be a "minority, in a minority state", and the SLMC were strongly opposed to the idea of Tamil Eelam. The situation was further aggravated with the creation of the Muslim Home Guard, by the Sri Lankan Government, leading to violent clashes and incidents taking place between the two communities. Tensions between the Tamils and Muslims were at an all-time high.

Expulsion
The first expulsion was in Chavakacheri, of 1,500 people.  After this, many Muslims in Kilinochchi and Mannar were forced to leave their homeland.  The turn of Jaffna came on 30 October 1990; when LTTE trucks drove through the streets ordering Muslim families to assemble at Osmania College.  On October 30, early morning, the LTTE ordered the north Muslims to leave in two hours, leaving behind every material possession that belonged to the community or otherwise to face death. Each person was allowed only 150 rupees each and only one set of clothes. Feeble protests were raised by Muslims. However, the brandishing of sophisticated weapons and threats in aggressive tones quickly silenced them. Women and girls were stripped of jewels. Some LTTE women cadres were brutal even pulling out ear studs with blood spurting in the ear lobes. At least 35 wealthy Muslim businessmen were abducted. They were detained by the LTTE. Some Muslim jewellers were tortured for details of hidden gold. One jeweller was killed by the beatings in front of the others. Later huge sums of money were demanded for their release. Some paid up to 3 million. The abducted persons were released in stages over the years. 13 people however never returned and were presumed dead. Moreover, the LTTE had expropriated Muslim homes, lands, and businesses and threatened Muslim families with death if they attempt to return.

The entire Muslim population was expelled from Jaffna. According to a 1981 census (the last official count), the total Muslim population in Jaffna was 14,844. In total, over 14,400 Muslim families, roughly 72,000 people, were forcibly evicted from LTTE-controlled areas of the Northern Province. This includes 38,000 people from Mannar, 20,000 from Jaffna and Kilinochchi, 9,000 from Vavuniya and 5,000 from Mullaitivu. The flight to government-controlled areas was dangerous. Muslims found themselves in the crossfire between the LTTE and the army, and some were killed and injured.

Most of the Muslims were resettled in Puttalam district, though the Jaffna Muslim refugees can be found in other parts of Sri Lanka as well.

Tareek, a former resident of Jaffna, recounted the expulsion as follows:

Aftermath

Apologies and resettlement by LTTE
The expulsion still carries bitter memories amongst Sri Lanka's Muslims. In a press conference in Kilinochchi in 2002, the LTTE negotiator and political strategist Anton Balasingham appeared alongside the LTTE leader Vellupillai Prabhakaran and explained that they had already apologized to the Muslims and that the Tamil homeland also belonged to the Muslim people. Balasingham also expressed that the expulsion of the Muslims from Jaffna was a political blunder which could not be justified and said that the LTTE leadership would be willing to re-settle them in the northern district. There has been a stream of Muslims travelling to and from Jaffna since the ceasefire. Some families have returned and the re-opened Osmaniya College now has 450 students enrolled. 11 Mosques are functioning again. According to a Jaffna Muslim source, there is a floating population of about 2000 Muslims in Jaffna. Around 1500 are Jaffna Muslims, while the rest are Muslim traders from other areas. About 10 Muslim shops are functioning and the numbers are thought to have grown. Harassment of Muslims in LTTE-held areas continued in the East such as putting up signs in Muslim villages demanding Muslims to leave "Tamil territory" and Muslim refugees fleeing the conflict in 2006 were channeled through LTTE checkpoints where they were abducted or executed.

Sri Lanka's largest Tamil party the Tamil National Alliance also condemned it during the ceremony held in Colombo 2015 to mark the completion of 25 years since Muslims were evicted from the North. TNA Parliamentarian M.A. Sumanthiran criticized the silence of Tamil people when it happened.

Hinderences for the return of internally displaced individuals to their traditional lands

On October 10, 2012, the government of Sri Lanka published several gazettes that effectively expanded the Wilpattu National Park's boundary to include northern provinces' regions. The original boundary of the park had enclosed the Puttalam District in the south and Anuradhapura District in the east. However, this expansion of the boundary prevented many people from returning to their homes and traditional lands within the newly designated park boundaries. The move was made under section 3 of the Forest Conservation Ordinance, chapter 451.

See also
 List of attacks attributed to the LTTE
 Expulsion of non-resident Tamils from Colombo
 Kattankudy mosque massacre
 Persecution of Muslims

References

External links
Essay - "Muslims have a right to know from the LTTE leadership"

Liberation Tigers of Tamil Eelam
Human rights abuses in Sri Lanka
Ethnic cleansing in Asia
Liberation Tigers of Tamil Eelam attacks in Eelam War II
Anti-Islam sentiment in Sri Lanka